Kane is a village in Greene County, Illinois, United States. The population was 438 at the 2010 census.

Geography
Kane is located in southern Greene County at  (39.190666, -90.352570).

Demographics

As of the census of 2000, there were 459 people, 174 households, and 128 families residing in the village. The racial makeup of the village was 98.47% White, 0.22% Native American, 0.22% Asian, and 1.09% from two or more races. Hispanic or Latino of any race were 0.22% of the population.

There were 174 households, out of which 36.8% had children under the age of 18 living with them, 60.9% were married couples living together, 9.8% had a female householder with no husband present, and 25.9% were non-families. 23.0% of all households were made up of individuals, and 12.1% had someone living alone who was 65 years of age or older.  The average household size was 2.64 and the average family size was 3.09.

In the village, the population was spread out, with 26.1% under the age of 18, 9.6% from 18 to 24, 32.0% from 25 to 44, 20.3% from 45 to 64, and 12.0% who were 65 years of age or older.  The median age was 34 years. For every 100 females, there were 96.2 males.  For every 100 females age 18 and over, there were 101.8 males.

The median income for a household in the village was $28,125, and the median income for a family was $31,250. Males had a median income of $25,938 versus $18,125 for females. The per capita income for the village was $11,325.  About 10.0% of families and 11.8% of the population were below the poverty line, including 15.5% of those under age 18 and 5.9% of those age 65 or over.

References

Villages in Greene County, Illinois
Villages in Illinois